Steve Coulter may refer to 

 Steve Coulter, NASCAR team owner
 Steve Coulter (musician), American member of the band Tsar
 Stephen Coulter (born 1914), English novelist and journalist
 Steve Coulter (born 1960), American actor
 Steve Colter (born 1962), American former professional basketball player
 Steven Coulter (born 1984), American actor